The Jericho Tavern is a music venue and pub in the Jericho area of Oxford, England, at 56 Walton Street. In the late 1980s and early 1990s it was an important part of the music scene which spawned Ride, Radiohead, and Supergrass.

History
Radiohead performed at the Jericho Tavern in 1986 under the name On A Friday. Supergrass secured a record deal after performing a gig there in 1994.

It was bought out in the 1990s by the Firkin chain. It became part of the Scream pub chain, then was restored to a music venue in 2005. Along with several other Oxford pubs, it is now owned by Mitchells & Butlers.

Other acts to play at the Jericho include Mumford and Sons, Stornoway, Bastille, Summer Camp, Tennis, Bombay Bicycle Club, Palma Violets, Razorcuts, Lianne La Havas, Savages, James Vincent McMorrow, Ben Howard, Foals,  Chad Valley, Pulp, Tush, String, and the Easter Island Statues. The Oxford Revue and The Oxford Imps also use the Jericho Tavern as a regular performing space.

References

External links
Official website
Beer in the Evening information

Pubs in Oxford
Music in Oxford